Khaled Rohaim is a multi-platinum, Grammy nominated producer and composer. Based in Sydney, Australia, Rohaim has created hits for artists such as Rihanna, The Kid Laroi and Ariana Grande.

Early life 
Rohaim has been making music since he was four years old when he would experiment with instruments around his family home. His father was a keyboard player for Egyptian guitarist Omar Khorshid.

Career 

In 2012, Rohaim signed a publishing deal with J-Remy and Bobby Bass of Orange Factory Music in partnership with Primary Wave and BMG.

From 2014 to 2020 Khaled Rohaim was a part of production team "Twice As Nice", founded by Nicholas "Unknown Nick" Audino & Lewis Hughes. Via Nick Audino, Khaled co-produced songs for artists such as Ty Dolla $ign, Kid Ink, Ariana Grande, Meghan Trainor & more.

Rohaim honed his skills creating multi-platinum hits for Australian Sony artists such as Jessica Mauboy and Justice Crew. In 2018, he co-wrote the song "Let Me" by Zayn.

In 2021, he, Nick Audino, Lewis Hughes and Te Whiti Warbrick from Twice as Nice, were added to the APRA AMCOS' 1 Billion List for their work on Rihanna's 2016 track "Needed Me".

Rohaim became a mentor and producer for The Kid Laroi when he met him at a recording studio in Sydney. Moved by The Kid Laroi's talent and difficult living situation, Rohaim would pick him up from various houses that he would live in around Sydney so they could eat together and record at his rented studio in North Strathfield. Rohaim gave The Kid Laroi some work writing songs for other artists to help him develop.

Moving to the United States is on the cards for Rohaim as he continues his work with The Kid Laroi and other high-profile artists such as Demi Lovato and Justin Bieber. "I think I'd do better if I was overseas. Being here has been hard, really hard. What I've been able to do from here, it's near impossible", he told The Sydney Morning Herald in 2021.

Discography

Awards and nominations

APRA Awards
The APRA Awards are held in Australia and New Zealand by the Australasian Performing Right Association to recognise songwriting skills, sales and airplay performance by its members annually.

! 
|-
| 2022
| Khaled Rohaim
| Breakthrough Songwriter of the Year
| 
|

References 

Year of birth missing (living people)
Place of birth missing (living people)
Living people
Australian record producers
Australian composers
Australian music arrangers